Have a Good Time is a live album by the American R&B singer Ruth Brown, released in 1988. Her first album for Fantasy Records, it was a factor in Brown's late 1980s career resurgence.

Production
Produced by Ralph Jungheim, the album was recorded at the Hollywood Roosevelt Hotel's Cinegrill. Charles Williams, Red Holloway, and Bobby Forrester were members of Ruth's backing band. "5-10-15 Hours", "Have a Good Time", "Teardrops from My Eyes", and "(Mama) He Treats Your Daughter Mean" are remakes of four of Brown's Atlantic hits.

Critical reception

The St. Petersburg Times thought that "the sheer giddiness that drove '5-10-15 Hours' or '(Mama) He Treats Your Daughter Mean' in the originals (almost 40 years old!) has been replaced by someone who knows everything worth knowing about phrasing, rhythm and life its ownself." The Philadelphia Inquirer called Have a Good Time "a great album: history without the history books," writing that Brown "tailors mighty vocal wails to the intimate environment of a jazz session, all the while playing off the charged, fiercely rhythmic accompaniment of organist Bobby Forrester."

AllMusic wrote that "Brown is assisted by a fine quintet ... for fresh remakes of some of her hits, along with some newer material."

Track listing

Personnel
 Ruth Brown - vocals
 Charles Williams - alto sax
 Red Holloway - tenor sax
 Bobby Forrester - organ
 Bill Williams - guitar
 Clarence Bean - drums
 Ralph Jungheim - producer
 John Eargle - engineer

References

Ruth Brown albums
1988 live albums
Fantasy Records live albums